Packard is a surname. Notable people with the surname include:

 Alicyn Packard, voice actress
 Alpheus S. Packard (1798–1884), American educator
 Alpheus Spring Packard (1839–1905), American entomologist and palaeontologist
 Becky Wai-Ling Packard, professor of Psychology and Education
 Damon Packard (born 1967), American film director
 David Packard (1912–1996), co-founder of Hewlett-Packard
 Dennis Packard (born 1982), Canadian ice hockey player
 Edward Packard (writer) (born 1931), American author
 Edward Packard (1819-1899), British fertilizer manufacturer
 Edward Packard (1843–1932), British fertilizer manufacturer
 Elizabeth Packard (1816–1897), American women's rights and mental health activist
 Emmy Lou Packard (1914–1998), American visual artist 
 Frank L. Packard (1877–1942), Canadian novelist
 Harrison Daniel Packard (1838–1874), surveyor in the early days of South Australia and the Northern Territory
 James Ward Packard (1863–1928), Automobile designer and manufacturer
Julie Packard, American conservationist and philanthropist
Keith Packard, American software developer
 Kelly Packard (born 1975), American actress
 Marlboro Packard (1828–1904), American master shipbuilder
 Norman Packard (born 1954), American physicist and chaos theorist
 Ron Packard (born 1931), American politician from California
 Vance Packard (1914–1996), American journalist, social critic, and author
 Walter Packard (1884 - 1966), National Director of the U.S. Rural Resettlement Administration 
 William Alfred Packard (1830–1909), American classical scholar
 William Doud Packard (1861–1923), American co-founder of Packard Motor Company
 William Guthrie Packard (1889–1987), American businessman
 William Packard (1933–2002), American poet and editor

Packard is also the name of the following fictional characters:
 Andrew Packard, fictional character on the American television show Twin Peaks
 Norris Packard, fictional character in MS Gundam

See also
Packard (disambiguation)
Pickard, a surname